The  was an Imperial Japanese Navy fleet. In accordance with the Anglo-Japanese Alliance, the fleet defended the West Coast of Canada as well as Allied shipping in the Pacific during World War I.

Background

As Canada emerged from the 19th century it still depended on the British Royal Navy for maritime defence.  As the British and the Germans entered a naval arms race; the British, concerned that the Germans would outproduce them, asked their Dominion governments to contribute financially to the building of new ships at the 1909 Imperial Conference.  This request imposed upon the Canadian Prime Minister Sir Wilfrid Laurier became known as the "naval question".  Due to internal conflicts Laurier decided that, instead of giving money to the British Royal Navy, Canada would build its own Navy.  A few ships were built or bought by the fledgling Canadian Navy but the decision was unpopular in Canada and contributed to the downfall of the Laurier government.

In the years leading up to World War I, Japan increased its presence near the West coast of North America. The ships and Vice-Admiral Kuroi, his captains, staff and the cadets were given a reception by the provincial government. The band of the 88th Fusiliers played for the occasion.

First World War

When World War I broke out in 1914, Canada's outdated ships were tasked with defence of the Atlantic shipping lifeline to the UK.  The Royal Navy decided to concentrate on the Atlantic theatre with the defence of Canada's west coast left to its ally, Imperial Japan.    Newspapers at the time claimed that if it was not for the Japanese Navy the German Imperial Navy would have "shelled Victoria and Vancouver to fragments."  Also on British request, the Japanese navy sent one or two cruisers from Vladivostok to Vancouver to assist in the transport of gold bullion.

See also
 1st Special Squadron (Japanese Navy) - Fleet assigned to patrol Australia 
 2nd Special Squadron (Japanese Navy) - Fleet assigned to patrol Mediterranean
 Third Fleet (Imperial Japanese Navy) - Fleet assigned to patrol Russian coast during the Soviet Revolution
 2nd Fleet (Imperial Japanese Navy) was a fleet of the Imperial Japanese Navy (IJN) created as a mobile strike force in response to hostilities with Russia, and saw action in every IJN military operation until the end of World War II.
 1st Fleet (Imperial Japanese Navy)

References

World War I naval ships of Japan
Fleets of the Imperial Japanese Navy
Canada–Japan relations
Japan in World War I
Canada in World War I
Military units and formations established in 1914
Military units and formations disestablished in 1918